This list of prehistoric barnacles is an incomplete, and ongoing listing of all barnacle genera known from the fossil record:

Acasta
Actinobalanus
Aporolepas
Archaeolepas
Arcoscalpellum
Armatobalanus
Arossia
Austrobalanus
Austromegabalanus
Austrominius
Balanus
Bassettina
Bathylasma
Blastolepas
Brachylepas
Bryozobia
Calantica
Catolasmus
Catomerus
Catophragmus
Ceratoconcha
Chamaesipho
Chelonibia
Chesaconcavus
Chionelasmus
Chirona
Chthamalus
Concavus
Coronula
Cretiscalpellum
Creusia
Cryptolepas
Cyprilepas
Dosima
Elminius
Emersonius
Endosacculus
Eoacasta
Eoceratoconcha
Eolasma
Eolepas
Eoverruca
Epopella
Euscalpellum
Fistulobalanus
Fosterella
Graviscalpellum
Hesperibalanus
Hexechamaesipho
Hexelasma
Ibla
Illilepas
Kathpalmeria
Lepas
Lophobalanus
Loriculina
Mclellania
Megabalanus
Membranobalanus
Mesolasma
Mesoscalpellum
Neolepas
Neoscalpellum
Nesochthamalus
Notobalanus
Notochthamalus
Octomeris
Oxynaspis
Pachydiadema
Pachylasma
Palaeobalanus
Paraconcavus
Pectinoacasta
Platylepas
Poecilasma
Pollicipes
Priscansermarinus
Proverruca
Pseudoacasta
Pseudoctomeris
Pycnolepas
Pyrgoma
Rehderella
Rogerella
Scalpellum
Schreteriella
Scillaelepas
Semibalanus
Smilium
Solidobalanus
Stramentum
Tamiosoma
Tasmanobalanus
Tessarelasma
Tesseroplax
Tesseropora
Tetraclita
Tetrinis
Titanolepas
Trilasmis
Trypetesa
Ulophysema
Verruca
Virgiscalpellum
Waikalasma
Waiparaconus
Zeascalpellum
Zeugmatolepas

See also

 List of prehistoric brittle stars
 List of prehistoric sea cucumbers
 List of crinoid genera

References
 

Lists of prehistoric arthropods
 List Of Prehistoric Barnacles